René Lacoste defeated defending champion Jean Borotra 6–3, 6–3, 4–6, 8–6 in the final to win the gentlemen's singles tennis title at the 1925 Wimbledon Championships.

Draw

Finals

Top half

Section 1

Section 2

Section 3

Section 4

Bottom half

Section 5

Section 6

Section 7

Section 8

References

External links

Men's Singles
Wimbledon Championship by year – Men's singles